Esmail Kahrizi (also Romanized as Esmā‘īl Kahrīzī; also known as Esmā‘īl Kandī) is a village in Hajjilar-e Shomali Rural District, Hajjilar District, Chaypareh County, West Azerbaijan Province, Iran. At the 2006 census, its population was 181, in 48 families.

References 

Populated places in Chaypareh County